Hatten is a municipality in Lower Saxony, Germany. 

Hatten may also refer to:

People
Hatten (name), a list of people who have the name Hatten

Places
Hatten, Bas-Rhin, a commune in the Bas-Rhin department in Grand Est in north-eastern France
Hatten (Lesja), a mountain in Lesja municipality in Innlandet county, Norway
Hatten Peak, a mountain peak in Queen Maud Land in Antarctica

Other
Hatten är din, an internet meme from 2000